Ms. Kelly is the second solo studio album by American recording artist Kelly Rowland. It was released on June 20, 2007, through Columbia Records in collaboration with Music World Entertainment. Originally titled My Story and expected for a mid-2006 release, the album marked Rowland's first solo studio album in four years. Retitled and delayed numerous times prior to its official release, the album's release date was eventually moved to 2007 in favor of a multi-tiered marketing strategy and additional recording sessions. Willed to produce a more personal effort after her debut studio album Simply Deep (2002), Rowland contributed nine tracks to the reworked Ms. Kelly, which took her solo work further into urban music markets, involving production by Scott Storch, Polow da Don, Soulshock & Karlin and singer Tank, among others.

Upon its release, Ms. Kelly received generally positive reviews from most music critics and achieved reasonable commercial success, debuting at number six on the US Billboard 200 and at number two on the US Top R&B/Hip-Hop Albums, selling 86,000 copies in its first week, being Rowland's highest first-week sales with a studio album to date. As a consequence, Columbia released three Deluxe reissues of the album the following year – an extended play (EP) Ms. Kelly: Diva Deluxe, Ms. Kelly: Deluxe Edition and another extended play Ms. Kelly: Digital Deluxe – containing previously unreleased songs and remixes. Exclusively at Walmart, Ms. Kelly was packaged with a bonus DVD titled BET Presents Kelly Rowland (2007). The DVD features BET and performance highlights, and music videos from Rowland's solo career.

Background
In 2002, Kelly Rowland teamed up with rapper Nelly to record the chorus and vocals on the track "Dilemma" for his album Nellyville. Released as the album's second single, the song became one of the most successful singles of the year, topping various charts worldwide, including the US Billboard Hot 100. Originally scheduled to be released in early 2003, the success of the collaboration caused the label to extend the release date of Rowland's debut solo album Simply Deep, which Rowland rushed within three weeks to get done and was described as alternative R&B. Released in the United States in October 2002 and internationally in 2003, Simply Deep was certified gold by the Recording Industry Association of America (RIAA), and has sold 602,000 copies in the United States. Released to an even bigger success in international territories, the album topped the UK Albums Chart and became a gold-seller in Australia, Canada, and New Zealand, resulting in worldwide sales total of two and a half million copies. The album yielded three singles. "Stole", a pop rock-influenced mid-tempo track about loss, was released as the album's lead single and became an international top-ten hit single, peaking at number two in Australia and the United Kingdom. In the United States, the song failed to capitalize on the success of "Dilemma", reaching the top-thirty only.

After a three-year hiatus that involved concentration on individual solo projects, Rowland rejoined Beyoncé Knowles and Michelle Williams for Destiny's Child's final studio album Destiny Fulfilled, released in November 2004. Meanwhile, Rowland had started work on the conception of her second solo studio album. She began collaborating with songwriter-producer Bryan Michael Cox, partner WyldCard, and production duo CKB. Some of their early recordings, including "Bad Habit" and "Flashback", were later included on Destiny's Child's final studio album as well as the group's live DVD Live in Atlanta (2006), respectively. As she was anxious to avoid hasty productions as on her previous album, which Rowland felt was less personal, she took a wider role in the production of the album; the singer co-wrote the majority of the songs and shared ideas in which one to produce. "I wrote a lot on this record [...] and it's especially from me [to my fans]," she told CNN about the album. "It's a feelgood record; very intimate. It's a sneak peak into my mind and heart of the past three or four years."

Music and lyrics
After the rock–dance sound which dominated her previous album Simply Deep, Rowland felt she was still struggling with finding her sound as solo artist, and instead of capitalizing off its international success, the singer and her management settled on "a more urban approach" with her second album. Commenting on her decision, Rowland later told MTV News, "in general, I'm going in the urban, more R&B route. Of course, that's what I started with Destiny's Child, [but on] my first solo album I did more of a pop-sounding record. So I wanted to go back to my roots and dibble and dabble with some beats." Consequently, Columbia Records consulted a wider range of contemporary R&B and hip hop producers and artists such as Big Tank, Patrick "J. Que" Smith, Rockwilder, Rich Harrison, Rodney Jerkins, and Robin Thicke to work with Rowland on the album. Female rappers Remy Ma, Eve, and Shawnna also lent their voices to guest parts.

Lyrically, love, independence, and maturity became reoccurring themes throughout the album. With songs such as "'I'm Still in Love with My Ex" and "Better Without You" inspired by Rowland's former relationship with American football player Roy Williams, most of the tracks Rowland recorded were relationship-driven, something she said she was not hesitant about discussing. "I just went in the studio and just did me, because I think that's when you get your best product. That's when it's just natural. It just flew out of my mouth and came out in lyrics [and] I had great writers involved." While recording her vocals, Rowland was inspired by several singers, citing former bandmate Beyoncé Knowles, and singers Brandy and Whitney Houston as major inspirations, "I listened to a lot of Whitney Houston for her vocals. I love her. I love Beyoncé's voice, and I love Brandy. Those are three vocalists who inspire me. I love how different they are. I love how they take themselves to the next level."

Songs

Opening song and lead single "Like This", which features rap from Eve, was one of the last songs recorded for Ms. Kelly. Noted for the use of a cowbell in its melody, the single was first released in March 2007 to mixed reviews and became Rowland's highest-charting solo single since "Stole" (2002). The second track, titled "Comeback", is one of the two tracks Scott Storch contributed to the album. Planned to be released as the album's second single, Rowland shot a music video for the track with director Philip Andelman in July 2007. When a single release failed to materialize, the video premiered on Rowland's official YouTube account in early 2008. "Ghetto" is set as the third track and features rapper Snoop Dogg. Originally recorded for the shelved My Story, the crunk-influenced track was released as the album's second single in North America in August 2007, where it achieved minor success, reaching number nine on the US Billboard Bubbling Under R&B/Hip-Hop Singles only. The album's fourth track, "Work", was written after returning from a night out in Miami and rushed in "like twenty minutes." An up-tempo composition featuring funk production and go-go elements, it was released as the album's second international single during the first quarter of 2008 and enjoyed major international commercial success, emerging as the highest-charting single off the album. Synthesized "Flashback" is the fifth track of the album and had previously appeared on Destiny's Child's video album Live in Atlanta (2006). Released to generally lukewarm reviews, the San Francisco Chronicle called it "positively lackluster". "Every Thought Is You", a ballad produced by Rockwilder, garanered positive critics, with About.com noting it "a classy, well-sung mid-tempo track about healthy infatuation". The seventh track "The Show" features a guest appearance by singer Tank, who produced the track. It's followed by a one-minute-long interlude. The ninth track "Still in Love with My Ex" was rumored to be about Rowland's ex-fiancée Roy Williams. The tenth track "Better Without You" speaks about a protagonist who feels better after ending a relationship. It's followed by the eleventh track "Love", and the album closes with a love song "This Is Love".

Release and promotion

Originally expected for a March 2006 release, the album had two title changes and three unofficial releases until its official release the following year. Initially scheduled for a July 11, 2006 release, the album's original draft, entitled My Story, was eventually shelved in favor of a revamped version with a different vibe. Although manager Mathew Knowles initially insisted that the decision to push the release date from July 2006 was because more time would be needed to properly set up the project, Rowland later admitted that she had been unsatisfied with the album's direction, and thus, she asked to rework with a stable of new record producers on the project. Speaking of the delay and the original track listing, she told Billboard: "it was basically a list of songs that I put together about the past three years of my life, with love and relationships", and added: "And I remember listening to the record, and I was just like, 'I don't want this to be too deep to where, you know, [I] lose people.' And the record was too full of midtempos and ballads, so I wanted to bring it up a little bit."

Her decision led to the cancellation of the album's original leading single "Gotsta Go", a collaboration with rapper Da Brat that she premiered on the MTV Asia Awards 2006 Bangkok on May 6, 2006. Rowland eventually consulted new producers to collaborate on the album, including Mysto & Pizzi, Sean Garrett, Scott Storch, and Atlanta-based Polow da Don, who contributed the single "Like This," a duet with rapper Eve, to the album. In addition, the singer decided to retitle the album. She stated: "I really put my heart and soul into this record and not only am I excited that everyone's going to hear the music, I'm looking forward to people getting to hear the real me. That's the reason I called the album Ms. Kelly. Because the title is all about respect, being an adult and that's how I feel about my life, and my music."

Other promotional efforts included a sophomore CD teaser in Live in Atlanta features. "Flashback" was also included on an audio disc packaged with the DVD.

Singles
Recorded late into the production of the album, Rowland and her management chose "Like This" as the lead single off Ms. Kelly. Moderately successful on the charts, the song reached the top ten in Canada, Ireland, and the United Kingdom, and dominated the US Dance Club Songs. "Comeback" was sent to urban radio on July 30, 2007, as the album's second single in the United States, while "Work" was released as the second international single and achieved greater success than "Like This". Pushed by a newly produced Freemasons remix, it reached the top ten on the majority of all European and Oceanic music charts. "Ghetto", featuring Snoop Dogg, followed with minor to no commercial success stateside. The album produced previously unreleased "Daylight" as fourth and final single; it became a top twenty success in the United Kingdom and helped introducing the Diva Deluxe reissue. Although never released as a single, Rowland shot a music video for "Comeback" back-to-back with the video for "Work". The track was originally planned to be released as the album's second single alongside ballad "Still in Love with My Ex". In a fan poll to determine the second single of the album, "Still in Love with My Ex" was chosen. This never materialized, however.

Tour

The Ms. Kelly Tour was Rowland's first North American tour. She had previously headlined an exclusive European Simply Deeper Tour (2003) for her debut solo album, Simply Deep. The Ms. Kelly Tour was originally scheduled to hit fifteen cities between October 2007 and December 2007, with a three-night finale in Las Vegas. However, three scheduled tour dates were cancelled with no ticket refunds. R&B singer Mario was the tour's opening act.

Critical reception

Ms. Kelly received generally positive reviews from music critics. At Metacritic, which assigns a weighted mean rating out of hundred to reviews from mainstream critics, the album received an average score of seventy, based on ten reviews. Alex Macpherson of The Guardian  gave the album four and a half stars out of five. He complimented Ms. Kelly as "poised, dignified and completely lacking in the hysteria normally associated with R&B divas giving vent to their feelings" but felt that "the emotions simmering beneath her glassy, controlled tones are as raw as any Mary J. Blige classic." Ben Williams of the New York Post referred the album as a "mostly upbeat record that soulfully delves into contemporary funk", while Entertainment Weekly found that "after a blah solo debut with 2002's Simply Deep, Kelly Rowland — assisted by producers like Scott Storch and Polow Da Don — brings the noise and the funk to her vibrant follow-up. Newsday writer Glenn Gamboa remarked that with Ms. Kelly, Rowland "doesn't dabble in various genres. She doesn't try to push the envelope. Rowland does what she does best: She cranks out one potential pop hit after another. Ms. Kelly shows that Rowland knows her strengths and that she intends to keep playing to them."

Andy Kellman from AllMusic found that Ms. Kelly "sounds like an album where Rowland is mostly sorting through some deeply personal relationship issues with a couple relatively lighthearted songs thrown in for variety." He noted that "all-around, the album does provide a stronger set of songs than 2002's Simply Deep. The material tends to be kind of insidious, rather than hitting you immediately or going through one ear and out the other." Giving the album three stars out of five, he also remarked that "the lyrics [...] are direct and specific, going beyond basic breakup material." Slant Magazine's Sal Cinquemani stated that, "this time around, both the production and lyrics are stronger." He praised the "bona fide club jams" on the album. Billboard wrote that while "Rowland may never upstage her superstar groupmate Beyonce, but she certainly has the vocal chops and charm to stand on her own stiletto-clad feet. Compared with her gospel-fueled 2002 solo debut, Rowland appears confident and dominant on foot-stompers [and] though still short of career-defining, Ms. Kelly finds its author opening up more while welcoming the possibility that destiny may just find another star.

In a mixed review for About.com, Mark Edward Nero characterized the album as "basically one by someone with the persona of a backup player who's been thrust in a lead role." While he praised songs such as "Work" and "Like This," Nero felt that the album contained too many "weak songs" and that Rowland, "although she may feel comfortable in the role, can't carry the full weight — just like Scottie Pippen never could with the [Chicago] Bulls." Dotmusics Jaime Gill called Ms. Kelly "old-fashioned", writing that "Rowland's big problem is that she has the lungs but not the voice [...] She can holler like Beyoncé, growl like Kelis or swoon like Aaliyah, but has little to no natural style of her own." Ken Capobianco's review for The Boston Globe was more emphatic dubbing it "a solid if somewhat safe set of grooves, but the album never takes full flight to become something special."

Commercial performance
Ms. Kelly was listed for thirty-three weeks on nine different charts. It made its first appearance on the Irish Top 75, Dutch Top 100 and Swiss Top 100. Its highest peak position worldwide was number six on the US Billboard 200, selling 86,000 units in its first week and becoming Rowland's highest entry on the chart. The album spent eleven weeks inside the chart. As of July 2011, Ms. Kelly has sold 222,000 copies in the United States.

Outside the United States, the album failed to enter the top forty of the majority of the charts it appeared on, except in the United Kingdom, where it debuted at number thirty-seven on the UK Albums Chart. The standard edition of the album sold 24,424 in the United Kingdom as of 2008. In Brazil, the album opened at thirty-seven; it also peaked at number ten on the Japanese International Albums Chart. The album struggled to appear in the top-fifty of the ARIA Albums Chart in Australia, peaking at number forty-four after several weeks on the chart. However, the album reached the top ten on the Australian Urban Albums, peaking at number eight.

The reissue, titled Ms. Kelly: Diva Deluxe, charted for three weeks on the top seventy-five UK Albums Chart, entering the chart at number twenty-three. It charted significantly higher internationally, peaking two weeks later on the European Top 100 Albums chart at number eighty.

Track listing
Credits adapted from the liner notes of Ms. Kelly.

Notes
 signifies a co-producer
 signifies an additional producer

Re-releases

Diva Deluxe

Following the original album's lukewarm sales and reception, Rowland re-entered recording studios to collect new songs for a reissue of Ms. Kelly, including production by Stargate, Jeff Dawson, CKB and Mark Feist. She was also expected to record with producer Danja, but deadline pressure prevented from happening; a new track by J. R. Rotem did not make the final cut. "The sales weren't as good as I wanted them to be and to be honest, I did feel sad about that for a little while", Rowland stated in 2008, still blaming the final track listing for too many midtempos and ballads. "I didn't realize it while I was recording it. After it was released [back in June] many fans said the songs would rock if they were more upbeat." Branded with the title Ms. Kelly: Diva Deluxe, the United States re-release received a digital download release only on March 25, 2008, containing seven tracks — five new songs and two remixes of songs found from the standard edition of the album. Previously unreleased song "Daylight", a Bobby Womack cover and collaboration with Travie McCoy of Gym Class Heroes, served as the reissue's new lead single. The international edition of the Ms. Kelly re-release was released physically and digitally in May 2008, retitled as Ms. Kelly: Deluxe Edition. It removed seven tracks from the original release and replaced them with six of the seven Diva Deluxe tracks, an additional remix of "Daylight" by Joey Negro and the internationally successful Freemasons remix of "Work", as Rowland "wanted to have another view on the record and close the Ms. Kelly chapter" with the re-release.

Ms. Kelly Deluxe

BET Presents Kelly Rowland

Background and release
On July 7, 2007, Columbia Records and BET released a joint DVD+CD version of the album called BET Presents Kelly Rowland. The DVD consists of a candid interview with Rowland as she talks about the production of Ms. Kelly, her time as a member of Destiny's Child, and her perspective on her celebrity status and solo career. The DVD also features BET highlights, performance highlights, and music videos from throughout Rowland's career.

The DVD was originally packaged with Rowland's second album, Ms. Kelly, exclusively at Walmart. However, it is now available for individual purchase at online shopping sites such as Amazon.com.

Track listing
BET Highlights
Access Granted: The Making of Kelly Rowland
Access Granted: "Stole"
Black Carpet Interview with Toccara

Performance Highlights
Hometown Church Performance
Destiny's Child Performance "Say My Name" Live in Atlanta
Glam-o-rama Minneapolis Performance
Kelly Performs "Bad Habit" and "Dilemma" Live in Atlanta
BET Awards 2005 Performance with Destiny's Child: "Cater 2 U"

Music Videos
"Stole"
"Dilemma"
"Bad Habit"
"Like This"
"Train on a Track" (previously unreleased in the US)

Credits and personnel
Credits adapted from the liner notes of Ms. Kelly.

 Kelly Rowland — vocals, executive producer, vocal producer
 Mathew Knowles — executive producer
 David Angell — violin
 Pamela Sixfin — violin
 Mary Kathryn Vanosdale — violin
 Craig Brockman — piano
 Christopher Farrell — viola
 Kristin Wilkinson — viola
 Anthony LaMarchina — cello
 Carl Marsh — conductor
 J. "Lonny" Bereal — vocal producer, vocal assistance
 Jason "Poo Bear" Boyd — vocal producer
 Montina Cooper — vocal producer, vocal assistance
 Huy Nguyen — vocal producer
 Wayne Allison — engineer
 Chris Jackson — engineer
 Colin Miller — engineer
 Brian Sumner — engineer
 Rommel Nino Villanueva — engineer
 Vadim Chislov — assistant engineer
 Gelly Kusuma — assistant engineer
 Kobla Tetey — assistant engineer
 Jason Goldstein — mixing
 Jean Marie Horvat — mixing
 Tony Maserati — mixing
 Dexter Simmons — mixing
 Phil Tan — mixing
 Andy Zulla — mixing
 Mike Fraser — mixing
 Christian Baker — mixing assistance
 Tom Coyne — mastering
 Chris Gehringer — mastering
 Fusako Chubachi — art direction
 Erwin Gorostiza — art direction

Charts

Weekly charts

Year-end charts

Release history

References

External links
 Ms. Kelly at Metacritic

2007 albums
Albums produced by Polow da Don
Albums produced by Poo Bear
Albums produced by Rockwilder
Albums produced by S*A*M and Sluggo
Albums produced by Sean Garrett
Albums produced by Scott Storch
Albums produced by Soulshock and Karlin
Albums produced by Stargate
Columbia Records albums
Kelly Rowland albums